Topham Guerin is an advertising agency company founded in New Zealand in 2016 by Sean Topham and Ben Guerin. The company is headquartered in Auckland and has offices in London and Sydney. It has worked on several high-profile political communications campaigns, including the 2019 Conservative Party election campaign in the UK.

History
Before the founding of their company, Sean Topham and Ben Guerin studied at universities in New Zealand. Both were members of the Young Nationals, a youth group of the New Zealand National Party. Sean Topham was the group's president from 2012 to 2015. The company was responsible for political communications for the British Conservative Party in the 2019 general election, and has worked for the Liberal Party in Australia. While working for the Liberal Party, Topham Guerin found success at engaging older people by creating purposefully low-quality memes that would generate a high organic reach. One anonymous individual who worked on this project dubbed the strategy 'boomer memes', according to The Sydney Morning Herald. Topham Guerin created an advert for the Conservative Party's 2019 election campaign, which featured Boris Johnson in a parody of a scene from the film Love Actually. The advert was "shot quickly on an iPhone to take up as little of the leader's time as possible and to get into the algorithmic churn almost immediately," Oliver Henry said in 2020

The London Review of Books reported that Guerin and Isaac Levido, another well known Conservative Party PR man, created the government's slogan, 'Stay alert, control the virus, and save lives.'

In November 2020, the firm was working on a campaign for the Association of the British Pharmaceutical Industry to promote the COVID-19 vaccine.

In a 2020 interview with the New Zealand website The Spinoff, Topham said, "The agency is not political. We work for our clients and deliver the best possible work that we can. We've had particular clients in that [conservative] space, and that's par for the course. Some people will suggest there's some narrative there, but I don't think that's accurate."

The Guardian called Topham Guerin's approach to campaigning "a 24-hour meme machine – a social media firehose of attention-grabbing, emotion-manipulating, behaviour-nudging messaging."

Following the Australian Liberal Party's victory in the 2019 elections, Ben Guerin spoke at the right-wing Friedman Conference to discuss its PR strategy. "You've got to surprise people. You've got to shock people. Unlock and arouse emotion in people," Guerin said.  "The particular emotions we've got to unlock are arousal emotions. We're talking: anger, excitement, pride, fear. Your content should be relating to one of these emotions for anyone to give a damn about it".

In 2021, they were engaged by the Conservative Party of Canada, along with UK-based Stack Data Strategy, to work on the party's national campaign for the 2021 Canadian federal election.

Controversies
In 2019, The Guardian reported that Topham Guerin worked for Conservative Party strategist Sir Lynton Crosby's CTF Partners to create a "large-scale professional disinformation network on behalf of paying clients including major polluters, the Saudi Arabian government, anti-cycling groups and various foreign political campaigns" on Facebook.

While working as subcontractors for Crosby's CTF Partners, "Topham gained a reputation for misogyny within the company" after celebrating women's departure from the company.

During the 2019 UK General Election, Topham Guerin changed the name of the Conservative Party's Twitter account to "factcheckUK," using the report to attack the Labour Party and its leader Jeremy Corbyn.

The company has won several contracts for PR work for the UK government since the start of the Coronavirus pandemic. As the government invoked emergency contracting regulations, at least one of these contracts was awarded directly to Topham Guerin without going to tender.

Topham Guerin was reported to be responsible for a UK government COVID-19 advert encouraging people to stay at home, criticized for being sexist in depicting gender roles. The ad sparked complaints due to the depiction of domestic tasks being handled by women, while the only visible male figure on the image was relaxing on a sofa.

Public engagement
On 8 May 2021, for World Ovarian Cancer Day, Topham Guerin participated in the Cure our Ovarian Cancer Foundation's international awareness campaign. Their spot "An ad you can't miss, for a cancer you do", which shows 30 women who had been diagnosed with ovarian cancer, was screened at Piccadilly Circus, London and Time Square, New York City. The spot was a pro bono production by Topham Guerin with Landsec and JCDecaux sponsoring the screening space.

References

Public relations companies
New Zealand companies established in 2016